The Cambridge Faculty of Divinity is the divinity school of the University of Cambridge. It houses the Faculty Library.

History 

Divinity has been taught in the University of Cambridge since its foundation, in the early 13th century, around the time the university itself was founded. It is one of only two subjects to have been taught continuously, in some form or other, throughout the entire 800-year history of the university.

The first professorship instituted at the university, the Lady Margaret's Professor of Divinity, was dedicated to the subject, in 1502. Similarly, the next professorships to be established at the university – the Regius chairs, of 1540 – included the Regius Professor of Divinity.

Beginning in 1879, the Faculty of Divinity was housed in the Selwyn Divinity School, constructed by Basil Champneys. Now known as The Old Divinity School, the building belongs to St John's College. Since 2001, the Faculty has been situated on the university's Sidgwick Site, in the west of the city.

Professorships 
Since the 16th century, the University of Cambridge has seen the institution of numerous professorships in different subject areas, beginning with divinity, civil law, physics, Hebrew, and Greek.

The established chairs in the Faculty of Divinity include the following:
 Lady Margaret's Professor of Divinity (1502)
 Regius Professor of Divinity (1540)
 Norris-Hulse Professor of Divinity (1777), combined in 1934 from the Norrisian Professor (since 1780) and the Hulsean Professor (since 1860)
 Ely Professor of Divinity (1889)

Academics 
The Faculty of Divinity is part of the Cambridge Theological Federation, offering academic training not only to the university's own graduates but also to ordinands as well. The current undergraduate degree is called "Theological and Religious Studies," rather than divinity, which reflects the range of topics and diversification in the field covered by the teaching.

Subject areas
Thematic and disciplinary areas of teaching and research in the Faculty of Divinity:

Old Testament
New Testament
Christian Theology
History of Christianity
Philosophy of Religion
Religious Studies
Late antiquity
Hebrew, Jewish, Early Christian
World Christianities
Scriptural languages

Lectures series 
Since 1820, the Faculty of Divinity has hosted named lectures. They include the following:
 Hulsean Lectures
 Jeremie Lecture
 Stanton Lectures
 Tyrwhitt Lecture
 Yerushah Lecture

Reputation and rankings 
For centuries the Faculty of Divinity at Cambridge, like the Faculty of Theology and Religion at the University of Oxford, has been prominent in theological studies not only in the United Kingdom but also across the globe.

As university rankings have increased in importance for higher education in recent decades, the Faculty of Divinity has also maintained a high international profile in this new metric system. In 2019, the QS World University Rankings placed the University of Cambridge as 6th worldwide. Nationally, the Faculty has been ranked 1st by the Complete University Guide (2018) and by The Guardian (2018).

Notable senior members
The following are notable past and present senior members of the Faculty of Divinity.

Past

 John Arrowsmith 
 Peter Baro
 Joseph Beaumont
 Robert Beaumont
 Richard Bentley
 James Bethune-Baker
 John James Blunt
 Zachary Brooke
 Edward Harold Browne
 Martin Bucer
 William Buckmaster
 George Bullock
 Francis Crawford Burkitt
 John Burnaby
 Thomas Jackson Calvert 
 Thomas Cartwright
 William Chaderton
 Henry Chadwick
 Eamon Duffy
 Frederick Henry Chase 
 Sarah Coakley
 Samuel Collins
 George Elwes Corrie 
 C. H. Dodd
 Charles John Ellicott 
 Desiderius Erasmus
 James Fawcett
 John Fisher
 David Ford
 Wiliam Glyn
 Humphrey Gower
 John Green 
 Peter Gunning
 John Hey 
 Richard Holdsworth
 John Banks Hollingworth 
 Morna D. Hooker
 Fenton John Anthony Hort
 Matthew Hutton
 William Ralph Inge
 Robert Jenkin
 James Amiraux Jeremie 
 John Kaye
 Alexander Francis Kirkpatrick
 G. H. Lampe
 Nicholas Lash
 Judith Lieu
 Joseph Barber Lightfoot
 Richard Love
 Joseph Rawson Lumby
 Donald MacKinnon
 John Madew
 John Mainwaring
 Fred Shipley Marsh
 Herbert Marsh
 Arthur James Mason
 Charles F. D. Moule
 Handley Carr Glyn Moule 
 Alexander Nairne 
 Dennis Eric Nineham
 Alfred Ollivant 
 John Overall 
 John Pearson
 John James Stewart Perowne 
 James Pilkington
 Leonard Pilkington
 Thomas Playfere
 Arthur Michael Ramsey
 Michael Ramsey
 John Randolph
 Edward Craddock Ratcliffe
 Charles Earle Raven
 John Redman (professor)
 John Richardson
 Nicholas Ridley
 Joseph Armitage Robinson 
 J. A. T. Robinson
 Thomas Rutherforth 
 Herbert Edward Ryle 
 Thomas Sedgwick
 William Selwyn
 Janet Soskice
 Graham N. Stanton
 Vincent Henry Stanton 
 George Christopher Stead
 John Still
 Charles Anthony Swainson
 Henry Barclay Swete 
 Stephen Sykes 
 William Telfer
 Anthony Tuckney
 Denys Alan Turner 
 Thomas Turton 
 Samuel Ward
 Richard Watson
 William Whitaker
 John Whitgift
 Ralph Widdrington
 Brooke Foss Westcott 
 John Young

Present

Douglas Hedley
George van Kooten
Nathan MacDonald
Catherine Pickstock
Richard Rex
Timothy Winter

References

Bibliography
David M. Thompson, Cambridge Theology in the Nineteenth Century: Enquiry, Controversy and Truth (London: Ashgate, 2008).

Divinity, Faculty of
Christianity in Cambridge
13th-century establishments in England
Christian seminaries and theological colleges